Devil in a Blue Dress is a 1995 American neo-noir mystery thriller film written and directed by Carl Franklin, based on Walter Mosley's 1990 novel of the same name and features Denzel Washington, Tom Sizemore, Jennifer Beals, and Don Cheadle. Set in the summer of 1948, the film follows World War II veteran Ezekiel "Easy" Rawlins who, desperate in need of a job, becomes drawn into a search for a mysterious woman. 

Devil in a Blue Dress received positive reviews, with many praising Cheadle's scene-stealing performance.

Plot
In 1948 Los Angeles, Ezekiel "Easy" Rawlins is laid off from his job at Champion Aircraft and needs money to pay his mortgage. Easy's bartender friend Joppy introduces him to DeWitt Albright, a white P.I. looking for a missing white woman, Daphne Monet. Explaining that Monet's disappearance led her wealthy fiancé, Todd Carter, to drop out of the Los Angeles mayoral race, Albright pays Easy to find Daphne, who is known to frequent the juke joints along Central Avenue.

Easy begins his search at an illegal club where he sees the bouncer, Junior Fornay, eject a white man. Learning that his friend Dupree Brouchard's girlfriend, Coretta James, is a confidant of Daphne, Easy spends the night with Coretta and discovers Daphne is involved with gangster Frank Green. Albright arranges a meeting at the Malibu pier, where Easy is accosted by racist white youths before Albright viciously humiliates one of the boys at gunpoint. Easy tells him about Green, and is given another payment to continue his search.

Returning home, Easy is arrested by LAPD homicide detectives, who reveal that Coretta has been murdered. Interrogated and beaten before being released, he is approached by Matthew Terell, the remaining mayoral candidate. Terell is with a young boy, supposedly his adopted son, and inquires about Daphne, but Easy divulges nothing. After a nightmare about Coretta, he receives a call from Daphne herself. They meet at the Ambassador Hotel, and she asks him to drive her to meet Richard McGee, a White man from the club. They arrive to find McGee dead, with his house ransacked. Easy notices a pack of Mexican cigarettes, the same brand smoked by Junior. Traumatized after witnessing the grisly scene, Daphne panics and flees, driving off in McGee’s car and abandoning Easy.

Easy drives home, but is threatened again by Albright and his partners, who demand that he track Daphne down a second time or face murder charges. Easy sends for his old friend, Raymond 'Mouse' Alexander, and confronts Joppy for leading Daphne to him. He meets with Todd Carter, realizing that Albright actually works for Terell, and secures another payment to locate Daphne. Returning home, he is ambushed by Frank Green but rescued by Mouse. Frank escapes after the trigger-happy Mouse shoots him in the shoulder, and Easy misses a call from Daphne. Questioned again by the detectives, Easy is given until the following morning to clear his name.

Easy and Mouse confront Junior – the owner of the cigarettes – who admits to driving McGee home and being given a letter for Coretta to deliver to Daphne. They visit Dupree in Compton where, inside Coretta's Bible, Easy finds the contents of a letter and incriminating photographs of Terell with naked children. At home, Easy finds Daphne waiting, and she reveals that Frank is her half-brother: their mother was Creole, and Daphne's father was white while Frank's was Black. Terell learned of Daphne's heritage, and the potential scandal forced Carter to abandon his campaign, but Daphne bought the pictures from McGee to blackmail Terell into silence. Hunting for Daphne and the pictures, Albright murdered McGee. When Coretta threatened to sell the pictures to Terell, Daphne sent Joppy to intimidate her, but did not expect him to kill Coretta.

Albright and his men arrive, subduing Easy and kidnapping Daphne. Joined by Mouse, Easy abducts Joppy at gunpoint, forcing him to take them to Albright's cabin in Malibu. Easy and Mouse kill Albright and his men and rescue Daphne; returning to the car, Easy learns Mouse killed Joppy due to him being a liability. Daphne pays Easy and Mouse $7,000 for the pictures, and Mouse returns home to Houston with his share. Daphne reveals that Carter's family paid her $30,000 to leave town, but she believes that the pictures will ensure Carter's victory and their marriage. Driving Daphne to meet Carter, who rejects her, Easy receives the rest of his payment in exchange for the pictures. Daphne and her brother leave town, while Carter's election is assured. No longer in trouble with the police, Easy considers starting his own business as a private investigator.

Cast

Production

Development
Carl Franklin wrote and directed the neo-noir because he liked the novel by Walter Mosley, who in turn served as an associate producer on the film. Franklin thought the work was more than a detective story; he said that Mosley was able to transform an everyday guy into a detective. In the editing process, Franklin had to cut a steamy love scene between Beals and Washington because he believed the scene was not needed to convey the story.

Don Cheadle originally did not want to audition for Mouse because he thought he was too young for the role.

Locations

The film was shot mostly in Los Angeles, California. The pier shot where Easy Rawlins gets in trouble with local youths was filmed at the Malibu, California pier. Other locales in Los Angeles include the Griffith Park Observatory and the famed Ambassador Hotel on Wilshire Boulevard.

Distribution
The producers used the following tagline to market the film:
In a world divided by black and white, Easy Rawlins is about to cross the line.

Devil in a Blue Dress premiered at the Toronto International Film Festival on September 16, 1995. In the United States, it opened in wide release on September 29, 1995. In its widest release the film was featured in 1,432 theaters across the country.

Home media

Devil in a Blue Dress was released on VHS on April 2, 1996, and then on laserdisc in June 1996. A DVD version was released on 9 March 1999. Twilight Time released on the film on Blu-ray on October 13, 2015.

Reception

Critical response
On Rotten Tomatoes, Devil in a Blue Dress has an approval rating of 92%, based on reviews from 118 critics, with an average score of 7.50/10. Its critical consensus reads: "Humor, interesting characters, and attention to details make the stylish Devil in a Blue Dress an above average noir." On Metacritic the film has a score of 78 out of 100, based on reviews from 21 critics, indicating "generally favorable reviews". Audiences surveyed by CinemaScore gave the film a grade A− on scale of A to F.

In a positive film review, critic James Berardinelli discussed Devil in a Blue Dress from a sociological viewpoint, especially one involving the 1990s. He concludes, "The most interesting element of Devil in a Blue Dress is not the whodunit, but the 'whydunit.' Finding the guilty parties isn't as involving as learning their motivation, which is buried in society's perception of racial interaction. By uncovering the truth behind this mystery, Franklin illustrates that some attitudes have indeed changed for the better over the last forty years."

Roger Ebert, writing for the Chicago Sun-Times, did not like the story much but enjoyed the look and tone of the film: "I liked the movie without quite being caught up in it: I liked the period, tone and look more than the story, which I never really cared much about. The explanation, when it comes, tidies all the loose ends, but you're aware it's arbitrary – an elegant solution to a chess problem, rather than a necessary outcome of guilt and passion."

Kenneth Turan, film critic for the Los Angeles Times and NPR, liked the film, and wrote: "Hard-boiled fiction is a been-around genre about done-that individuals, so the pleasant air of newness and excitement that Devil in a Blue Dress gives off isn't due to its familiar find-the-girl plot. Rather it's the film's glowing visual qualities, a striking performance by Denzel Washington and the elegant control Carl Franklin has over it all that create the most exotic crime entertainment of the season."

Many critics applauded Don Cheadle's performance, for which he won multiple awards. Jerry Renshaw said, "Cheadle steals every scene where he appears as Mouse ..." but he was disappointed by Beals' performance. In Variety, film critic Todd McCarthy wrote, "Entering the main flow of the story relatively late, Don Cheadle steals all his scenes as a live-wire, trigger-happy old buddy of Easy’s from Texas, while Sizemore and Mel Winkler, as colorful underworld figures, make strong impressions."

Box office
The first week's gross was $5,422,385 from 1,432 screens and the total receipts in the United States and Canada were $16,004,418. The film grossed $22 million worldwide against a budget of $27 million.

Accolades

Wins
 Los Angeles Film Critics Association Awards: LAFCA Award; Best Supporting Actor, Don Cheadle; 1995.
 National Society of Film Critics Awards: NSFC Award; Best Cinematography, Tak Fujimoto; Best Supporting Actor, Don Cheadle; 1996.

Nominated
 San Sebastián International Film Festival: Golden Seashell Award, Carl Franklin; 1995.
 Edgar Allan Poe Award: Best Motion Picture, Carl Franklin; 1996.
 Image Awards: Image Award; Outstanding Lead Actress in a Motion Picture, Jennifer Beals; Outstanding Motion Picture; Outstanding Soundtrack Album; Outstanding Supporting Actor in a Motion Picture, Don Cheadle; 1996.
 Screen Actors Guild Awards: Outstanding Performance by a Male Actor in a Supporting Role, Don Cheadle; 1996.

Others

In 2008, the American Film Institute nominated Devil in a Blue Dress for its Top 10 Mystery Films list.

Music

The original score for the film was written and recorded by Elmer Bernstein. The original music soundtrack was released on September 12, 1995, by Sony. The CD included 14 tracks, three of them written by Bernstein (theme, etc.).

 "West Side Baby" - T-Bone Walker
 "Ain't Nobody's Business" - Jimmy Witherspoon
 "Hy-Ah-Su" - Duke Ellington
 "Hop Skip And Jump" - Roy Milton
 "Good Rockin' Tonight" - Wynonie Harris
 "Blues After Hours" - Pee Wee Crayton
 "I Can't Go On Without You" - Bull Moose Jackson
 "'Round Midnight" - Thelonious Monk
 "Chicken Shack Boogie" - Amos Milburn
 "Messin' Around" - Memphis Slim
 "Chica Boo" - Lloyd Glenn
 "Theme From 'Devil In A Blue Dress'" - Elmer Bernstein
 "Malibu Chase" - Elmer Bernstein
 "End Credits" - Elmer Bernstein

See also
 List of films featuring home invasions

References

External links

 
 
 
 Devil in a Blue Dress at the TCM Movie Database
 Devil in a Blue Dress at Virtual History
 

1995 films
1990s crime films
American detective films
American mystery films
American thriller drama films
African-American films
1990s English-language films
Films scored by Elmer Bernstein
Films about racism
Films based on American novels
Films based on crime novels
Films directed by Carl Franklin
Films set in 1948
Films set in Los Angeles
Films produced by Gary Goetzman
Home invasions in film
TriStar Pictures films
American neo-noir films
African-American drama films
1990s American films